Fauxbergé (Russian: фальшберже) is an ironic term coined to generally describe items that are faking a higher quality or status and in specific terms relates to the House of Fabergé (Russian: Дом Фаберже), which was a Russian jewellery firm founded in 1842 in St. Petersburg and nationalised by the Bolsheviks in 1918. The term was first mentioned by auctioneer and Fabergé book author Dr. Geza Habsburg-Lothringen in his article titled 'Fauxbergé' published in Art and Auction in 1994. He also used it during the exhibition "Fabergé in America" in 1996 and subsequently.

Today the term is a part of the expertise vocabulary in the field of Fabergé, used to refer to items that are copies, counterfeits, or pastiches, of historical Fabergé products made between 1885 and 1917.

History of genuine objects
The production of Fabergé objects around 1900 poured out a much vaster number of pieces than the popular perception. The reason for this being that only 50 Imperial Easter Eggs were completed, while general Fabergé objects and jewelry items could exist in high numbers. It is estimated that the Fabergé company produced over a half a million products between 1842 and 1917. With over 500 craftsmen and designers working for the company in its heyday, under Peter Carl Fabergé's 35-year tenure as head of the firm, it is believed that over 200,000 objects -from pins, brooches, bracelets, tiaras, umbrella handles, picture frames, flower studies, presentation boxes, snuff boxes, cigarette cases, clock cases and all sorts of objets d'art- were produced between 1882 and 1917. In its time Fabergé had been the most recognized and most highly valued jewelry brand in the world, surpassing Cartier and others by far.

The company had its flagship store and main workshop in St. Petersburg (1842). Later four additional branches were added: Moscow (1887), Odessa (1901), London (1903) and Kiev (1906).

In response to a growing demand, apart from his own in-house workshops, Carl Fabergé worked with a number of outer workshops, managed by the so-called workmasters, who were in charge of a team of craftsmen, from jewelers, enamellers, goldsmiths, designers, etc. These semi-independent workshops were specialized in a particular area, e.g. producing frames, silver pieces, carved stone animals, etc. each had its own distinctive style and the workmaster owned his own firm under the Fabergé umbrella, signing their own initials to their creations, along with the Fabergé hallmark. According to Habsburg a sure way to sort out fakes is that Fabergé always used a maximum of two stamps and that most copies show more than two stamps. 

Companies such as Cartier and Tiffany's started to sell similar objects, and even bought from the same sources. Especially the stone animals, which are never stamped or engraved can be mistaken for Fabergé originals.

Notable figures

Armand Hammer
Armand Hammer was a well known dealer in Fabergé and Fauxbergé. According to Geza von Habsburg, Armand's brother Victor Hammer stated Stalin's trade commissar Anastas Mikoyan provided Fabergé hallmarking tools to Armand in order to sell fakes, and Victor stated a 1938 New York sale he ran with Armand, which grossed several million dollars, consisted of both genuine and faked items, with commissions going back to Mikoyan.

Edward Jay Epstein's book Dossier: The Secret History of Armand Hammer also confirms that he used a “set of the signature stamps of the Faberge workshops, so he could doctor unsigned items in the back room” and “was thus able to expand vastly the supply of Faberge”. Next an account describing the process to his mistress:

Alexander Ivanov
In January 2021, an art dealer specialized in Russian art and Fabergé, denounced in an open letter to the director of the Hermitage Museum Mikhail Piotrovsky, and later articles, that the exhibition “Fabergé: Jeweller to the Imperial Court” (25 November 2020 – 14 March 2021) had a number of fakes on display, including five eggs, in order to "legitimize counterfeits and enhance their market-value by exhibiting them in the Hermitage". The scandal was echoed by the international press. 

Regarding those eggs, Geza von Habsburg told the BBC: "Judging by the photographs and descriptions published online, all of the so-called 're-found Fabergé Imperial Easter Eggs' from the museum in Baden-Baden displayed in this exhibition are fakes, in my opinion." Some other Fabergé experts such as Alexander von Solodkoff and Ulla Tillander-Godenhielm also doubted the authenticity. 

Von Habsburg also expressed to The Art Newspaper: "What Ruzhnikov has written is in my opinion and in the opinion of a number of my colleagues, correct."  "It is unusual for a museum to show items with no provenance or scholarly research to back up their authenticity."

No fewer than 65 of the 91 Fabergé items on display originated from the private museums of two interrelated Russian collectors: the Fabergé Museum in Baden-Baden (46 items), the Russian National Museum in Moscow (11), both linked to Alexander Ivanov, and the Museum of Christian Culture in St Petersburg (8), linked to Konstantin Goloshchapov, who also appears, along with Ivanov, as co-founder in January 2008 of the private limited company Fabergé Museum GmbH, which owns the museum in Baden-Baden. Around 40% of the 91 Fabergé items exhibited were fake, in the opinion of the above-mentioned art dealer.

Following the Hermitage scandal, a research article published in February 2021 by the BBC revealed,  amongst other information, that in the late 1990s Ivanov was allowed to study and photograph Fabergé pieces kept in the Fersman Mineralogical Museum in Moscow.

Shortly thereafter, in Ivanov's collection, which also includes authentic Fabergé pieces, appeared objects that were similar to those in the Fersman Museum. He claimed that he owned the originals, but the Kremlin Museums confirmed that the genuines recognized by experts were in the Fersman Museum. However, pieces very similar to those in the Fersman were exhibited in the Hermitage as real, like a carved stone figurine called Soldier of the Reserves (1915). The chief curator of the Fersman, Mikhail Generalov, told the BBC that he considered this figurine a copy made "so shamefully that it's a shame for Fabergé." He also stated that the museum had sent a letter to the Hermitage outlining its concerns and position regarding the originality of this item, but did not receive a substantive response.

In that letter addressed to Piotrovsky, the director of the Fersman Museum, Pavel Plechov, commented:

Several of the pieces in the controversial Hermitage exhibition had previously been shown at the New Jerusalem State Museum of History and Art in Istra, near Moscow, between 15 December 2018 - 24 March 2019.

See also
 Freddy Novelo
 Tatiana Fabergé
 Victor Hammer

References

External links
 Fauxbergés: The Master Forgers. Lecture by Geza von Habsburg. Montreal Museum of Fine Arts
 Video with Andre Ruzhnikov, the art dealer who uncovered the Hermitage Fabergé scandal. CBS News
 Fabergé exhibition video showing the 5 fake eggs identified by Ruzhnikov, displayed together with a genuine one, the so-called Rothschild. Hermitage Museum
 Idem 

Jewellery
Fabergé